Compton Ignatius White Jr. (December 19, 1920 – October 19, 1998) was a two-term congressman from northern Idaho. A Democrat, he was elected to the open seat in the first district in 1962 and re-elected in 1964. White left office in January 1967 and is the last from the Idaho Panhandle region to represent the state in Congress.

Early years
The son of Congressman Compton I. White and Josephine Elizabeth White (née Bunn), White was born in Spokane, Washington, and grew up in his family's hometown of Clark Fork, Idaho, and in Washington, D.C. He attended George Washington University in Washington, D.C. for his freshman year of college, then transferred to the University of Idaho in Moscow, where he graduated in 1942.

During World War II, White worked as an engineer for Boeing in Seattle, and also in mining, logging, and livestock breeding. After the war, he returned to Clark Fork and served on the school board. From 1958 to 1962 White served as mayor of Clark Fork.

Congress
In 1960, White announced his candidacy for the U.S. Senate seat held by Republican Henry Dworshak, but was third of five in the Democratic primary. Runner-up Bob McLaughlin of Mountain Home won the runoff over leader Gregg Potvin of American Falls, but lost the general election. That seat was open again in 1962 after Dworshak's death in July, and Gracie Pfost was the Democratic nominee, vacating her 1st district seat in the House. White won the Democratic primary and general election, the same seat his father held for eight terms.

White was re-elected in the Democratic landslide of 1964, but was defeated for a third term in 1966 by Republican state senator Jim McClure of Payette, who defeated him again in 1968.

Source:

After Congress
White secured a position as a consultant with the U.S. Treasury Department in 1967. Unopposed for the Democratic nomination in 1968, he ran again against the incumbent  McClure, but lost by a large margin. Afterwards, White returned to Clark Fork and served on its city council, as well as working in ranching once again.

His grandson, Ryan M. White, currently serves as Legislative Director for Idaho Senator Jim Risch.

References

External links

University of Idaho Library – Compton I. White Jr. papers, 1963-1966

1920 births
1998 deaths
American aerospace engineers
George Washington University alumni
Mayors of places in Idaho
People from Sandpoint, Idaho
Politicians from Spokane, Washington
University of Idaho alumni
Democratic Party members of the United States House of Representatives from Idaho
20th-century American politicians
People from Bonner County, Idaho